The Apostolic Nuncio to Botswana is the principal representative of the Holy See (whose head is the Pope) to the Government of Botswana.

Officeholders 
Apostolic Delegates 
 Blasco Francisco Collaço (24 May 2000 – 17 August 2006)
 James Green (17 August 2006 – 7 February 2009)
Apostolic Nuncios 
 James Green (7 February 2009 – 10 March 2012)
 Mario Roberto Cassari (10 March 2012 – 22 May 2015)
 Peter Bryan Wells (9 February 2016 – 8 February 2023)

See also 
 Apostolic Nuncio to South Africa

References 

Diplomatic missions of the Holy See
Diplomatic missions in Botswana